Tenhi is a Finnish neofolk band formed in 1996. 

The music of Tenhi is minimalistic and dark. Usually, the rhythm instrument lines follow the customs of modern rock music. The melodical instruments and vocals are however very heavily folk-influenced. The basic instrumentarium of the band consists of acoustic guitar, bass and drums. Frequent additional instruments include piano, violin, viola and flute and less frequent didgeridoo, mouth harp, harmonium, cello, udu and synthesizer.

Members

Current members
 Tyko Saarikko – acoustic guitar (1996–present), electric guitar (1996–1997), synthesizer (1996–present), vocals (1997–present), didgeridoo (1999–2002), Jew's harp (1999–2002), udu (2000–2002), piano (2004–present), harmonium (2004–2011), percussions (2004–2006)
 Ilmari Issakainen – bass (1998–present), guitar (1999–present), piano (1999–present), percussions (1999–2007), backing vocals (1999–present), drums (2000–present)
 Janina Lehto – flute (2000–2007, 2017–present)
 Inka Eerola – violin (2000–2007, 2017–present)
 Jaakko Hilppö – backing vocals (2002–present), live bass (2000–present) (also session bass on "Väre" (2002))
 Tuukka Tolvanen – backing vocals (2003–present), live acoustic guitar (2000–present)

Former members
 Ilkka Salminen – drums (1997-2000), bass (1997–1998, 2004–2008), acoustic guitar (1997–2008), synthesizer (1997–1998), lead vocals (1998–2008), harmonium (2004–2008), percussions (2004–2008)
 Eleonora Lundell – violin (1998–2000), viola/alto violin (2000–2003)
 Veera Partanen – flute (1999–2000)
 Paula Lehtomäki – viola (2008–2012)

Live/session members
 Jussi Lehtinen – piano (2001–2007, 2015–present) (also session backing vocals on "Saivo" (2011))
 Raimo Kovalainen – drums (2001–2007, 2015–present)

Former live/session members
 Kirsikka Wiik – cello (on "Väre" (2002))
 Paula Rantamäki – violin (2007–2017)
 Janina Lehto – flute (on "Saivo" (2011))
 Heikki Hannikainen – contrabass (on "Saivo" (2011))
 Elisa Ollikainen – cello (on "Saivo" (2011))
 Thomas "Inve" Riesner – live guest violin (2015, Prophecy Fest 2015) (Dornenreich)
 Jochen "Evíga" Stock – live guest acoustic guitar (2015, Prophecy Fest 2015) (Dornenreich)

Timeline

Discography
 Kertomuksia (demo, 1997)
 Promo Tape (demo, 1997)
 Hallavedet (mcd, 1998)
 Kauan (CD, 1999)
 Airut:ciwi (mcd, 2001)
 Väre (CD, 2002)
 Airut:aamujen (CD, 2004, originally released under Harmaa name as a side-project, in 2006 was re-issued under Tenhi name)
 Maaäet (CD, 2006)
 Folk Aesthetic 1996-2006 (compilation, 3CD in book format, 2007)
 Saivo (CD, 2011)

Compliation appearences
 Whom the Moon a Nightsong Sings (compilation, 2010) (V/A, track "Kausienranta")

References

External links
 Tenhi at MySpace.com
 Utustudio
 Prophecy Productions (Tenhi's label)

Interviews
 Tenhi Interview 2004 at Heathen Harvest
  Tenhi Interview II 2006 at Heathen Harvest

Finnish musical groups
Neofolk music groups